Salvador Lo Presti (17 August 1922 – 3 January 2014) was an Argentine weightlifter. He competed in the men's lightweight event at the 1948 Summer Olympics.

References

External links
 

1922 births
2014 deaths
Argentine male weightlifters
Olympic weightlifters of Argentina
Weightlifters at the 1948 Summer Olympics
Place of birth missing